Johanne Brekke (born 11 August 1978) is a Welsh sports shooter.

Brekke won a gold medal at the 2002 Commonwealth Games in the Women's Smallbore Rifle Prone Pairs event alongside Ceri Dallimore, a bronze medal at the 2006 Commonwealth Games in the 50m Rifle Prone event and another bronze medal at the 2010 Commonwealth Games in the 50m Rifle Prone Event. She also competed in 1998.

She was a Royal Air Force Air Cadet.

References

1978 births
Living people
Welsh female sport shooters
Shooters at the 1998 Commonwealth Games
Shooters at the 2002 Commonwealth Games
Shooters at the 2006 Commonwealth Games
Shooters at the 2010 Commonwealth Games
Commonwealth Games gold medallists for Wales
Commonwealth Games bronze medallists for Wales
Commonwealth Games medallists in shooting
Royal Air Force Air Cadets
British female sport shooters
Medallists at the 2002 Commonwealth Games
Medallists at the 2006 Commonwealth Games
Medallists at the 2010 Commonwealth Games